<noinclude>
Albert Bryan Jr. (born February 21, 1968) is a Virgin Islander politician who is the ninth governor of the United States Virgin Islands, since 2019. A member of the Democratic Party. Prior to being elected, Bryan served as Commissioner of the Department of Labor.

Early life and professional career
Bryan was born on the island of St. Thomas, to Albert Sr. and Genevieve (Pilgrim) Bryan, the oldest of five sons. He grew up in the Savan neighborhood of Charlotte Amalie, the territory’s capital. As a teenager, Bryan moved to St. Croix, where he graduated from St. Dunstan's Episcopal High School in 1985. Bryan earned his Bachelor of Arts in economics from Wittenberg University in 1989. He later received a Master of Business Administration from the University of the Virgin Islands St. Croix Campus in 2003.

In 2007, Governor John de Jongh appointed Bryan as Commissioner of the Virgin Islands Department of Labor. When de Jongh's term ended in 2015, he returned to the private sector. Bryan was CEO and President of Aabra Group, a consulting firm, and Master Strategies, a recruiting firm. He also was executive director of the Virgin Islands chapter of Junior Achievement.

2018 gubernatorial election
In April 2018, Bryan officially announced his candidacy for governor and chose Tregenza Roach as his running mate. They won the August 4 Democratic primary earning 39.23% of the vote to defeat former Finance commissioner Angel E. Dawson Jr. and former Senator Allison "Allie" Petrus. Bryan led the 2018 general election with 38% of the vote and won the runoff defeating incumbent governor Kenneth Mapp with over 55% of the vote. He became the second Democrat to unseat a sitting governor since Charles W. Turnbull in 1998.

2022 gubernatorial election
Bryan launched his re-election bid for a second term on May 11, 2022. In the August 6 primary, Bryan defeated Kent Bernier Sr. with 65.04% of the vote. He won the November 8 general election against Senator Kurt Vialet and two other candidates, while receiving 56% of the vote.

Political career

Inauguration
 Bryan was sworn in as the 9th governor of the United States Virgin Islands by Rhys Hodge, Chief Justice of the Supreme Court of the Virgin Islands on January 7, 2019, at the David Monsanto Bandstand, which was built by his grandfather Ulric “Sappy” Pilgrim in Emancipation Gardens on St. Thomas. Prior to the ceremony, Bryan and his family attended a inaugural mass at Saints Peter and Paul Cathedral. The inauguration proceed with military parades and inaugural balls held on all three islands.

First term
Bryan requested an extension to the Sheltering and Temporary Essential Power (STEP) program which FEMA approved. Due to shortage of psychiatrists, Bryan issued an executive order declaring a mental healthcare state of emergency in the territory. In April 2019, Bryan stated a new major hotel will be on St. Croix during his first term. Bryan paid off all outstanding debt to the Virgin Islands Water & Power Authority for the current year of 2019 and prior years leading to the government being up to date on payments. Bryan launched the Envision Tomorrow program to assist homeowners and landlords whose properties were damaged by two hurricanes in 2017. 

A member of the National Governors Association, Bryan was appointed in February 2021, to co-chair the NGA Task Force on Community Renewal. On August 27, 2021, Bryan filed a lawsuit to prevent the implementation of Act 8472 which reduces the WAPA board from its current nine members to seven.

COVID-19 pandemic
On March 13, 2020, Bryan declared a state of emergency with the arrival of coronavirus. On March 19, Bryan lowered gatherings to 10. Effective March 25, Bryan ordered all non-essential businesses to close and residents stay at home. On April 8, Bryan postponed in-person public school classes for remainder of the 2019-2020 school year. A month after transitioning from "Safer at Home" to the "Open Doors" phase, Bryan required travelers entering the territory from several states such as Arizona, Texas, Florida to show a negative Covid test taken within 72 hours. He also moved to close beaches early at 4pm starting July 3 to July 5, ahead of the holiday weekend while bars and nightclubs closed at midnight until further notice. On August 4, Bryan requested the legislature to extend the current State of Emergency order through October 9. Amid Covid surge, Bryan reinstated his “Stay at Home” phase which shuttered non-essential businesses including churches and school campuses for two weeks. On September 8, Bryan stated that all inbound travelers must provide a negative PCR test upon arrival or face a mandatory 14-day quarantine. On November 24, Bryan ordered a soft two-week shutdown for government agencies. On February 1, 2021, Bryan requested the legislature an 30-day extension of the current State of Emergency to March 8. In June 2021, Bryan announced his Vax-to-Win lottery incentive. On July 26, 2021, Bryan expressed frustration with the territory’s low vaccination rate as he aimed to get 15,000 residents vaccinated by September. On March 14, 2022, Bryan lifted the indoor mask mandate but remains in place at ports of entry, medical facilities, nursing homes and schools. In June 2022, Bryan issued an executive order extending the Covid-19 pandemic state of emergency until June 30, 2022.

Proposed legislation
 January 28, 2019: A bill allowing the attorney general to serve for six-year terms.
 October 25, 2019: The Virgin Islands Emergency Medical Services System Act to merge Fire Services with EMS.
 December 2, 2019: An amendment called “Virgin Islands Cannabis Use Act” to the enacted Medicinal Cannabis Patient Care Act 
 January 16, 2020: The Virgin Islands Behavioral Health and Developmental Disability Act
 May 19, 2020: Virgin Islands Cannabis Use Act (resubmitted amended version to 33rd Legislature)
 August 11, 2020: Matching Fund Securitization Act
 August 15, 2022: A bill to increase the amount of funding for retroactive wages from $25 million to $40 million to repay government employees. (Senate approved: 08/30/2022 ; Enacted by Governor: 09/16/2022)

Travels

Residence
Bryan currently lives in Government House in Christiansted on St. Croix. In March 2019, the West Indian Company authorized monthly rent payments of $3,500 for a condo where Bryan would stay while on St. Thomas on behalf of his request.

Conflict of interest
In July 2020, it was revealed that Avera, a company co-owned by Bryan’s oldest daughter and his friend, Michael K. Pemberton received a $1 million no-bid contract from Dept. of Health for Covid-19 contact tracing although no experience. That same month, the V.I. Housing Finance Authority board awarded a $2.1 million contract to The Strategy Group firm owned by John Engerman, a close friend to Bryan who served as his 2018 campaign manager.

Personal life
Bryan and his wife, Yolanda Cabodevilla, have been married since 1998. They have two daughters. On April 20, 2022, Bryan tested positive for Covid-19 following recent trips in Washington, D.C. and Miami, Florida.

References

External links

|-

1968 births
Living people
21st-century American politicians
Democratic Party of the Virgin Islands politicians
Democratic Party governors of the United States Virgin Islands
Governors of the United States Virgin Islands
University of the Virgin Islands alumni
Wittenberg University alumni